Ellis Reco Simms (born 5 January 2001) is an English professional footballer who plays as a striker for  club Everton.

Club career
Simms was born in Oldham, Greater Manchester. After playing for Blackburn Rovers and Manchester City as a youth, he signed for Everton at the age of 16. In July 2017, Simms won the golden boot at the CEE Cup in Czech Republic with six goals in four games. He turned professional in 2019.

In January 2021, Simms moved on loan to Blackpool, making his debut on 23 January 2021 in the FA Cup as a substitute against Brighton & Hove Albion in a 2–1 loss. In his second appearance and his league debut the following week, again as a substitute, he scored his first professional goals when he scored twice in a 5–0 win over Wigan Athletic.

On 26 January 2022, Simms joined Scottish Premiership side Heart of Midlothian on loan for the remainder of the 2021–22 season. He made his league debut the same day in a 2–1 loss at home to Celtic, coming off the bench at half time to replace Josh Ginnelly. He scored his first goal for Hearts three days later in a 2–0 home win against Motherwell.

On 29 July 2022, Simms signed for EFL Championship club Sunderland on loan for the duration of the 2022–23 season. He was recalled on 31 December 2022. He scored his first goal for Everton on 18 March 2023, scoring a late equaliser in a 2–2 draw away at Chelsea.

International career
Simms is eligible to play internationally for England, Poland and Jamaica. On 6 November 2020, he was called up to the England U20 squad for a training camp. The following week, he played for England U20s as a second-half substitute in an unofficial friendly match against Aston Villa.

Career statistics

References

External links
Profile at the Everton F.C. website

2001 births
Living people
Footballers from Oldham
English footballers
Association football forwards
Blackburn Rovers F.C. players
Manchester City F.C. players
Everton F.C. players
Blackpool F.C. players
Heart of Midlothian F.C. players
Sunderland A.F.C. players
English Football League players
Premier League players
Scottish Professional Football League players
English people of Polish descent
English people of Jamaican descent